Roger Federer defeated Andy Murray in the final, 4–6, 7–5, 6–3, 6–4 to win the gentlemen's singles tennis title at the 2012 Wimbledon Championships. It was his seventh Wimbledon title and 17th major title overall. With the win, Federer also regained the world No. 1 ranking. Federer thus equalled both William Renshaw and Pete Sampras' all-time record of seven Wimbledon titles, as well as Sampras' record of 286 weeks as world No. 1.

Novak Djokovic was the defending champion, but lost in the semifinals to Federer.

Murray became the first British man to do reach the final since Don Budge defeated Bunny Austin in 1938. The championships was also notable for one of the biggest upsets in recent years, when world No. 100 Lukáš Rosol beat world No. 2 and two-time Wimbledon champion Rafael Nadal in the second round, 6–7(9–11), 6–4, 6–4, 2–6, 6–4, ending Nadal's streak of 11 major quarterfinals. The loss also ended Nadal's season, as he did not play tennis again until February 2013 at the Chile Open.

This marked the last major for 2002 finalist and former world No. 3 David Nalbandian, 2003 French Open champion and former world No. 1 Juan Carlos Ferrero, former top 15 player Juan Ignacio Chela, and the last Wimbledon appearance for three-time finalist and former world No. 1 Andy Roddick.

Seeds

  Novak Djokovic (semifinals)
  Rafael Nadal (second round)
   Roger Federer (champion)
  Andy Murray (final)
  Jo-Wilfried Tsonga (semifinals)
  Tomáš Berdych (first round)
  David Ferrer (quarterfinals)
  Janko Tipsarević (third round)
  Juan Martín del Potro (fourth round)
  Mardy Fish (fourth round)
  John Isner (first round)
  Nicolás Almagro (third round)
  Gilles Simon (second round)
  Feliciano López (first round)
  Juan Mónaco (third round)
  Marin Čilić (fourth round)
  Fernando Verdasco (third round)
  Richard Gasquet (fourth round)
  Kei Nishikori (third round)
  Bernard Tomic (first round)
  Milos Raonic (second round)
  Alexandr Dolgopolov (second round)
  Andreas Seppi (first round)
  Marcel Granollers (first round)
  Stan Wawrinka (first round)
  Mikhail Youzhny (quarterfinals)
  Philipp Kohlschreiber (quarterfinals)
  Radek Štěpánek (third round)
  Julien Benneteau (third round)
  Andy Roddick (third round)
  Florian Mayer (quarterfinals)
  Kevin Anderson (first round)

Qualifying

Draw

Finals

Top half

Section 1

Section 2

Section 3

Section 4

Bottom half

Section 5

Section 6

Section 7

Section 8

References

External links

 2012 Wimbledon Championships – Men's draws and results at the International Tennis Federation

Men's Singles
Wimbledon Championship by year – Men's singles